In algebra, an integrable module (or integrable representation) of a Kac–Moody algebra  (a certain infinite-dimensional Lie algebra) is a representation of  such that (1) it is a sum of weight spaces and (2) the Chevalley generators  of  are locally nilpotent. For example, the adjoint representation of a Kac–Moody algebra is integrable.

References

External links 

Algebra